Rif is a sandbank in the Dutch Wadden Sea, lying between Ameland and Schiermonnikoog, north of Engelsmanplaat. Additionally, the sandbank is a breeding place for birds and seals use it to give birth on.

References

External links 
 

West Frisian Islands
Islands of Friesland
Uninhabited islands of the Netherlands